Zorro and the Three Musketeers (also known as Mask of the Musketeers and Zorro vs. the Three Musketeers) is a 1963 Italian comedy-adventure film directed by Luigi Capuano and starring Gordon Scott.

Plot
In the 17th century, Zorro joins forces with the Three Musketeers to rescue a princess kidnapped by a Spanish emissary.

Cast 

 Gordon Scott as Zorro 
 José Greci as Isabella 
 Giacomo Rossi Stuart as  Athos
 Livio Lorenzon as Porthos 
 Roberto Risso as  Aramis 
 Nazzareno Zamperla as D'Artagnan
 Franco Fantasia as Count of Sevilla 
 Nerio Bernardi as Cardinal Richelieu
 Gianni Rizzo as  King Philip 
 Maria Grazia Spina as  Manuela 
 Mario Pisu as Count of Tequel 
 Ignazio Leone as Sancho
 Giuseppe Addobbati   
 Ignazio Balsamo 
 Enzo Maggio  
 Renato Malavasi  
  Ugo Sasso  
 Bruno Scipioni  
 Charles Fawcett  
 Benito Stefanelli  
 Nando Tamberlani

References

External links

1963 films
1960s Italian-language films
Italian adventure comedy films
1960s historical adventure films
Films directed by Luigi Capuano
Italian crossover films
Zorro films
Films based on The Three Musketeers
1960s adventure comedy films
Films set in the 17th century
Films set in France
Films set in Paris
Films set in Spain
Films set in Madrid
Italian historical adventure films
1960s historical comedy films
Italian historical comedy films
Films based on works by Johnston McCulley
1960s American films
1960s Italian films